The Town may refer to:

Film and television
 The Town (1945 film), a World War II propaganda film
 The Town (2010 film), a crime thriller film directed by and starring Ben Affleck
 The Town (2022 film), an Iranian drama film
 The Town (2012 TV series), a drama written by Mike Bartlett
 "The Town" (The Simpsons), episode in the 28th season

Literature
 The Town (Richter novel), by Conrad Richter
 The Town (Faulkner novel), by William Faulkner
 The Town (newspaper), published in London from 1837 to 1840

Other uses 
 The Town (Strindberg), 1902 painting by August Strindberg
 "The Town" (The Weeknd song), from the 2013 album Kiss Land
 Longford Town F.C., an Irish association football club
 Oakland, California, a city in the United States

See also
 Town (disambiguation)